Mitsukuri (written: 箕作 or 三栗) is a Japanese surname. Notable people with the surname include:

 (1857–1909), Japanese zoologist
 (1846–1897), Japanese jurist and educator
 (born 1939), Japanese gymnast

Japanese-language surnames